The Custom House and Old Post Office is a historic site located at 281 Front Street, Key West, Florida, United States. On September 20, 1973, it was added to the U.S. National Register of Historic Places.

Key West Museum of Art & History at the Custom House
The Custom House currently serves as the Key West Museum of Art & History, which is one of four museums operated by the Key West Art & Historical Society.  Exhibits include local history, famous personalities including Ernest Hemingway, maritime history, and works by local artists.

The building was designed by architect William Kerr, and was completed in 1891. The United States District Court for the Southern District of Florida met here from its completion until 1932, when the building was transferred to the United States Navy.

Gallery

See also 
List of United States post offices

References

External links 

 Monroe County listings at National Register of Historic Places
 Florida's Office of Cultural and Historical Programs
 Monroe County listings
 Museum of Art and History at the Custom House
Key West Museum of Art & History at the Custom House

Government buildings completed in 1891
Buildings and structures in Key West, Florida
Landmarks in Key West, Florida
History of Key West, Florida
Customshouse
National Register of Historic Places in Key West, Florida
Tourist attractions in Key West, Florida
Art museums and galleries in Florida
History museums in Florida
Former federal courthouses in the United States
Culture of Key West, Florida
Custom houses in the United States
Custom houses on the National Register of Historic Places
1891 establishments in Florida